Thaumatoptila verrucosa is a species of moth of the family Tortricidae. It is found on Sumba in eastern Indonesia.

References

Moths described in 1984
Polyorthini